Afer is a genus of sea snails, marine gastropod mollusks in the family Buccinidae.

Species
Species within the genus Afer include:
 Afer afer (Gmelin, 1791)
 Afer cumingii (Reeve, 1848)
 Afer echinatus Fraussen, 2008
 Afer ignifer Fraussen & Trencart, 2008
 Afer lansbergisi Delsaerdt, 1993
 Afer porphyrostoma (Reeve, 1847)
 Afer pseudofusinus Fraussen & Hadorn, 2000
Species brought into synonymy
 Afer africanus (Sowerby III, 1897): synonym of Africofusus africanus (G. B. Sowerby III, 1897) (superseded combination)
 Afer chinensis MacNeil, 1960: synonym of Siphonofusus chinensis (MacNeil, 1960)

References

External links
 Conrad T.A. (1858). Observations of a group of Cretaceous fossil shells, found in Tippah County, Mississippi, with descriptions of fifty-six new species. Journal of the Academy of Natural Sciences of Philadelphia. ser. 2, 3: 323-336, pls 34-35

 
Buccinidae
Gastropod genera